Systematic Parasitology is a monthly peer-reviewed medical journal covering all aspects of the taxonomy and systematics of parasites. It was established in 1979 and is published by Springer Science+Business Media. The editor-in-chief is Aneta Kostadinova (Academy of Sciences of the Czech Republic).

Abstracting and indexing 
The journal is abstracted and indexed in:

According to the Journal Citation Reports, the journal has a 2013 impact factor of 1.035.

References

External links 
 

Springer Science+Business Media academic journals
Publications established in 1979
Parasitology journals
Monthly journals
English-language journals